Sarepta is an unincorporated community in Calhoun County, Mississippi, United States.

History
A post office operated under the name Sarepta from 1838 to 1986. Don Grist (1935=2022), Mississippi judge and state legislator, was born in Sarepta.

References

Unincorporated communities in Calhoun County, Mississippi
Unincorporated communities in Mississippi